Jerry A. Kearns (born July 8, 1944) is a Democratic politician who represented the 83rd District in the Iowa House of Representatives since 2008.

He was ranking member of the Veterans Affairs Committee and also served on the Agriculture, Labor, and Ways and Means Committee.

Education
Kearns graduated from Wyaconda High School in Missouri in 1962. He later attended Southeast Iowa Community College and also went to a four-year electrician apprenticeship.

Career
From 1965 to 1969, Kearns served in the US Air Force.
Outside politics Kearns spent 38 years as an industrial electrician at Henniges Automotive.

Organizations
Kearns has been a member of the following organizations:
Lee County Board of Supervisors
American Legion
Elks Club
University of Iowa Labor Advisory Board
Lee County Democratic Party 
Iowa Democratic Party
Keokuk's Trinity United Methodist Church

Family
Kearns is married to his wife Diane and together they have two sons, Christopher and Aaron, along with seven grandchildren.

References

External links
Representative Jerry Kearns official Iowa General Assembly site
Jerry Kearns State Representative official constituency site
 

Democratic Party members of the Iowa House of Representatives
Living people
People from Keokuk, Iowa
1944 births
Place of birth missing (living people)
21st-century American politicians